West Coast Bad Boyz, Vol. 1: Anotha Level of the Game is the first compilation album released by No Limit Records. It was originally released on August 9, 1994, but was later re-released on July 22, 1997. Due to it being a re-release, the album couldn't make it to the Billboard 200 or any other regular charts, but it did make it to #1 on the Top R&B/Hip-Hop Catalog Albums. Due to a beef between Master P and King George, Two songs that featured George [Locked Up and Peace 2 Da Streets] were not included on the 1997 re-release.

Track listing 
West Coast Bad Boyz, Vol. 1: Anotha Level of the Game

References

Hip hop compilation albums
1994 compilation albums
No Limit Records compilation albums
Priority Records compilation albums
Gangsta rap compilation albums